The 2021 Westchester County Executive election was held on November 2, 2021. The election was between incumbent county executive George Latimer  and former advisor to former county executive Rob Astorino Christine Sculti. The elections were held on the same day as elections for county legislature. Latimer defeated Sculti by a comfortable margin.

General election

Notes

References

2021 New York (state) elections